Walter Fitzwilliam was an English politician who sat in the House of Commons from 1621 to 1622.

Fitzwilliam was the son of Sir William Fitzwilliam of Gaynes Park, Essex, and his wife Winifred Mildmay, daughter of Sir Walter Mildmay. He was admitted at Emmanuel College, Cambridge on 29 September 1591. In 1621, he was elected Member of Parliament for Peterborough.

References

16th-century births
17th-century deaths
Year of birth missing
Year of death missing
English MPs 1621–1622
Alumni of Emmanuel College, Cambridge